Kudlu is a census town in the Kasaragod district, state of Kerala, India. Kudlu is a suburb of Kasaragod city

Demographics
As of 2011 Census, Kudlu had a population of 26,235. Males constitute 48% of the population and females 52%. Kudlu had an average literacy rate of 94%, higher than the national average of 74.04%: male literacy was 96.6%, and female literacy was 91.6%. 12% of the population was under 6 years of age.

References

Suburbs of Kasaragod